The Mac Magus is a Czech single-place paraglider that was designed by Peter Recek and produced by Mac Para Technology of Rožnov pod Radhoštěm in the mid-2000s. It is now out of production.

Design and development
The aircraft was designed as an advanced and competition glider. The models are each named for their approximate wing area in square metres.

Variants
Magus 24
Small-sized model for lighter pilots.
Magus 26
Mid-sized model for medium-weight pilots.
Magus 28
Large-sized model for heavier pilots.

Specifications (Magus 28)

References

Magus
Paragliders